Dubbak is a village in Nizamabad district, Telangana, India. The village is located 35 kilometers from Nizamabad. , the village's population was 5,563, with 2,747 males and 2,816 females.

References

Villages in Nizamabad district